The Fujifilm X-Pro1 is a mirrorless interchangeable-lens digital camera announced in January 2012 and launched in March 2012. It is part of Fujifilm's X-Series of cameras. In October 2012 Fujifilm released a very similar, yet smaller, camera named the X-E1. In January 2016 Fujifilm announced its successor, the X-Pro2.

Key features 
 16-megapixel, APS-C sized "X-Trans" CMOS sensor 
 Compatible with the Fujifilm X-mount system of lenses
 2nd generation Hybrid Viewfinder
 TTL Hot Shoe and Sync Terminal

Fujifilm "X-Trans" CMOS sensor 

The Fujifilm X-Trans CMOS sensor used in the X-Pro1 (and other Fuji X-series cameras) is claimed to provide higher resolution than full-frame sensors, and also produce better colour reproduction.

Anti-aliasing filters are used on standard Bayer Array Sensors to reduce moiré effect when shooting regular patterns - however they are known to slightly reduce resolution. The "X-Trans" CMOS sensor uses a different pattern of pixels in order to reduce moiré without the need for an AA filter.

This same pattern ensures that all horizontal and vertical lines of pixels contain R, G and B pixels whereas Bayer array sensors do not have R and B in some lines.

Hybrid viewfinder
Fujifilm's Hybrid Viewfinder allows photographers to choose between an optical finder (OVF) and a high-resolution electronic view (EVF), complete with previews of depth of field and white balance. It also allows different optical magnifications and frame sizes to allow accurate framing with any of the XF-mount lenses in the system.

When an XF lens is mounted on the camera body, the most appropriate of the two available viewfinder magnifications is combined with the correct frame size.

Reviews
A number of reviews by popular photography websites have been very positive - with some noticeable negatives identified with the camera. The camera's high ISO performance is often cited as a strength, while reviews initially called out poor auto focus performance in low light and battery life as two of the main weaknesses. Since its release, several firmware upgrades have been released that have significantly improved autofocus speed.

Firmware updates
Fuji has adopted a "Kaizen" approach, meaning continual updates and innovation in releasing firmware updates to the X-Pro1. Since the launch of the camera, there have been 21 firmware updates to fix bugs, improve the camera's performance and add new features. Key areas improved include the camera's autofocus accuracy and speed, as well as new features such as focus peaking in the latest 3.0 firmware update.

References

X-Pro1
Cameras introduced in 2012